Todrah is an Austroasiatic language of Vietnam. The two dialects, Sodrah and Xodrah, are quite distinct. Speakers are officially classified by the Vietnamese government as Sedang people.

Todrah contrasts clear, breathy and laryngeal vowels.

Distribution
Todrah (Sơ-Drá, Xơtrá, SơRá) is spoken in Đắk Glei District, Kon Tum town, and Kon Plông District of Kon Tum Province (Le et al. 2014:175)

According to Ethnologue, it is spoken northeast of Kon Tum city, from Kon Hring to Kon Braih.

References

Languages of Vietnam
Bahnaric languages